Argyrophis siamensis, also known as the Siamese blind snake or Thailand worm snake, is a species of snake in the Typhlopidae family.

References

siamensis
Reptiles described in 1864
Taxa named by Albert Günther